"Stella Ella Ola" (Stella Stella Ola), also known as "Quack Dilly Oso", is a clapping game where players stand or sit in a circle placing one hand over their neighbour's closer hand and sing the song. On every beat, a person claps their higher hand onto the touching person's palm. The cycle continues until the song ends at which point if the person's hand is slapped, they are considered "out" and must stand or sit in the center of the circle, or leave the circle and watch from the edges.

If the player to be slapped pulls their hand away fast enough, the person who attempted to slap the hand is out.

Lyrics 
Stella Ella Ola,
Clap, clap, clap
Singing es, chico, chico
Chico, chico, clap, clap
Es chico, chico 
Baloney, baloney 
Cheese and macaroni 
Fire 1, 2, 3, 4, 5!

Another common version is:

Stella Ella Ola,
Clap, clap, clap
Singing es, chico, chico
Chico, chico, clap, clap 
Say es chico, chico
Below, below
The toilet overflowed
Say 1, 2, 3, 4, 5, 6, 7, 8, 9, 10!

A common variant of Stella Ella Ola, Quack Dilly Oso, follows the same game rules:

Quack dilly oso,
Quack quack quack
Señorita,
rita rita rita,
flora, flora,
flora flora flora,
1, 2, 3, 4!

 Canadian regional versions Saskatchewan, Canada:Stella Ella Ola,
Clap, clap, clap
Singing es, chico, chico
Chico, chico, clap
I said hello, hello 
I want to blow your nose
Fire 1, 2, 3, 4!Alberta, Canada (versions differ):Stella Ella Ola,
Clap, clap, clap
Singing es, chico, chico
Chico, chico, cracker jacker
Es chico, chico
Baloney, baloney
With cheese and macaroni
Singin' 1, 2, 3, 4, 5, 6, 7, 8, 9, 10!Toronto, Ontario (versions differ):Stella Ella Ola,
Quack, quack, quack
Say yes, chico, chico
Chico, chico, quack
Say yes, chico, chico,
Below, below,
The toilet overflows 
Say 1, 2, 3, 4, 5, 6, 7, 8, 9, 10!Elmira, Ontario (versions do not differ):Stella Ella Ola,
Chop, chop, chop
Singin’ es, teego, teego
Teego, teego, chop, chop
Es teego, teego
Blow, blow
The toilet overflowed 
Singin’ 1, 2, 3, 4, 5!Vancouver, British Columbia (versions differ):Stella, Stella, Ola
Clap, clap, clap
Say a yes, chigo, chigo
Chigo chigo, clap
Say a yes, chiga, chiga
Flow flow flow flow flow
Fire 1, 2, 3, 4, 5!Winnipeg, Manitoba:Stella Ella Ola
Clap, clap, clap
Singing es, chico, chico
Chiko, chico, clap, clap
Es chico, chico
Flow, flow
Flow, flow, flow
So, 1, 2, 3, 4, 5!Winnipeg Beach, Manitoba:Stella Ella Ola
Crah, crah, crah, crah
Singing es, chico, chico
Chiko, chico, chack chack
Es chico, chico
Valoh, Valoh,
Valohvahlohvalohvah
1, 2, 3, 4, 5!Prince Edward Island, Canada:Stella Ella Ola
Clap, clap, clap
Sayin' yes, chiga chiga
Chiga chiga, chap
Sayin' yes, chiga chiga
Flow, flow
Flow, flow, flow
Sayin' 1, 2, 3, 4, 5!New Brunswick, Canada:Stella Ella Ola
Clap, clap, clap
Sayin' yes, chico chico
Chico chico, chap
Say yes, chico chico
Aloa, aloa
The toilet overflows!
Sayin' 1, 2, 3, 4, 5!Northwest Territories, Canada:Stella Ella Ola
Clap, clap, clap
Sayin' S, tiga tiga
Tiga tiga, clap, clap
Baloney, baloney
Cheese and macaroni
Sayin' 1, 2, 3, 4, 5!Saskatoon, Saskatchewan:Stella Ella Ola,
Clap, clap, clap
Say yes, chico, chico
Chico, chico, chap
Say yes, chico chico,
Aloa, aloa, aloa-loa-loa!
Say 1, 2, 3, 4, 5!Ottawa, Ontario:Stella Ella Ola,
Clap, clap, clap
Say yes, chico, chico
Chico, chico, chaw
Say yes, chico chico,
My love, my love, my love my love my love! 
Say 1, 2, 3, 4, 5!

American regional versions
Stella Ella ola
Flapjack flapjack
Es chiga chiga
Chiga chiga flapjack
Go slow go slow go slow
1, 2, 3, 4…

Stella Ella ola
Clap clap clap
Saying death to the old ones
Tiga tiga shack shack
Death to the old ones
Valo valo valo valo valo va
1, 2, 3, 4, 5

Stella Ella ola 
Clap clap clap
Saying es tiga tiga 
Tiga tiga shack shack
Es tiga tiga
Valo valo valo valo valo va
1, 2, 3, 4, 5

Slap dilly oh so,
Slap slap slap
San sandorica
Rica rica rica,
Delores, delor's delor lor lor lor
1, 2, 3, 4, 5, ....

 Variations 

 Two players 
 Players slap both hands up and down. In some variations, they continue to alternate until the final count, where the person whose hands are on the bottom is out.
 Players grab each other's right hand just by the fingers and then hold their left hands out to the side. They move their linked right hands from side to side, hitting a left hand on each count. If that child swings her or his hand away on the last count, the other loses.
 Players hold hands and on the last count, they try to pull the other person over a line.
Players hold hands, with one players arms crossed, and swing their hands side to side so that the player with crossed arms changes. Whoever ends with there arms crossed (or doesn't, depending on where you are) wins. Sometimes you are allowed to pull each other's arms crossed at the end to see who wins.

 Three players 

 In one three-player version, one player will turn around and the other two players will hold hands and alternate positions. At the end, the person who is turned around will say either top or bottom. The hand who is in that position is champ.
 In another, which can be played with as many people as players wish, but has a minimum of three players, all participants sit in a circle. Their right hand rests on top of the left hand of the player on their right. One person starts, by lifting their right hand, and slapping the right hand of the player on their left. At the end, the person who has the last slap will either slap the hand of the person beside them, or that person will yank their hand away, causing the slapper to hit their own hand. The player that is hit is then out. If no one is hit, the player who was slapping is out.

 Appearances in other media 
 The lyrics sung in the game make an appearance in track 10 of Børns' album Blue Madonna "Supernatural".
 The game also makes an appearance in season 6 episode 3 of the CBC show Mr. D''.

References 

 

English children's songs
American folk songs
Canadian folk songs
Traditional children's songs
Clapping games